"Paper" is a song performed by Icelandic singer Svala. The song was released as a digital download on 20 March 2017 through Ríkisútvarpið. It represented Iceland in the Eurovision Song Contest 2017, and was written by Svala Björgvinsdóttir, Einar Egilsson, Lester Mendez, and Lily Elise. The song was originally released in its Icelandic version, "Ég veit það".

Eurovision Song Contest

On 20 January 2017, Svala was confirmed to be taking part in Söngvakeppnin 2017, Iceland's national final for the Eurovision Song Contest 2017. Both the English and Icelandic versions of the song were released on that day through the Icelandic broadcaster, Ríkisútvarpið (RÚV). Svala competed in the second semi-final on 4 March 2017, with the Icelandic version of the song. She gained the highest number of votes and advanced to the final, held on 11 March 2017. In the final, Svala performed the English version of the song. In the first round, she earned the highest number of public votes and votes from the jury, advancing to the superfinal along with Daði Freyr Pétursson. In the superfinal, she won over 62% of the vote, and was declared the winner, earning the right to represent Iceland in the Eurovision Song Contest 2017. Iceland competed in the second half of the first semi-final at the Eurovision Song Contest. The act did not qualify for the final, and was eliminated in semi-final 1.

Track listing

Charts

Release history

References 

Eurovision songs of Iceland
Eurovision songs of 2017
2016 songs
2017 singles
Songs written by Lester Mendez
Number-one singles in Iceland